The ice hockey team rosters at the 1956 Winter Olympics consisted of the following players:

Austria
Head coach: Udo Holfeld

Canada
Head coach: Bobby Bauer

Czechoslovakia
Head coach: Vladimír Bouzek

Germany
Head coach:  Frank Trottier

Italy
Head coach:  Bibi Torriani

Poland
Coaches: Mieczysław Palus, Wladysław Wiro-Kiro

Soviet Union
Head coach: Arkady Chernyshev

Assistant coach: Vladimir Yegorov

Sweden
Head coach: Folke Jansson

Switzerland
Head coach: Heinrich Boller

United States
Head coach: John Mariucci

References

Sources

Hockey Hall Of Fame page on the 1956 Olympics

rosters
1956